Cedar Valley may refer to:

Canada
 Cedar Valley, Peterborough County, Ontario, a town
 Cedar Valley, Wellington County, Ontario, a hamlet in Erin, Ontario
 Cedar Valley, Regional Municipality of York, Ontario
 Cedar Valley, a community in Whitchurch-Stouffville, Ontario

United States

Arizona
 Cedar Valley, Arizona, the location of Cedar, Arizona

Iowa
 Cedar Valley, Iowa, an unincorporated community in Iowa in the Waterloo/Cedar Falls metropolitan area
 Cedar Valley Formation, a geologic formation in Iowa dating back to the Devonian period
 Cedar Valley, the region surrounding the Cedar River

Minnesota 
 Cedar Valley Township, St. Louis County, Minnesota

Missouri 
 Cedar Valley, Missouri, an extinct town

Ohio 
 Cedar Valley, Ohio, an unincorporated community

Oklahoma 
 Cedar Valley, Oklahoma, a city

Utah
 Cedar Valley (Iron County, Utah), United States, the location of Cedar City
 Cedar Valley (Utah County, Utah), United States, a valley of Utah

Other places 

 Cedar Valley, Antigua and Barbuda, a town

Other uses 
 Cedar Valley, a 2018 novel by Australian author Holly Throsby
Cedar Valley (Cyprus), a valley in the Troodos Mountains